Citrus macrophylla, also known as alemow, is a citrus tree and fruit, belonging to the papedas.

The trees are short in stature, more tropical in nature than most citrus, and are very spiny.

Taxonomy 
Alemow is rare and poorly studied, a likely hybrid between the citron and biasong (C. micrantha). The large fruits are considered inedible by local populations, though the plants are infrequently cultivated for medicinal and other uses.  It has been tried in California as a possible rootstock for other citrus.

Notes

References 
 NRCC scientist Sonkar gets gold medal for work on Alemow
 Alemow on Citrus Variety Collection website
 Alemow (Citrus macrophylla Wester) — a dwarfing ...
 Citrus ID

macrophylla
Fruits originating in Asia